Kopivnik is a settlement in the Municipality of Rače–Fram in northeastern Slovenia. It lies on the eastern edge of the Pohorje Hills, above Fram. The area is part of the traditional region of Styria. The municipality is now included in the Drava Statistical Region.

References

External links
Kopivnik at Geopedia

Populated places in the Municipality of Rače-Fram